is a commercial radio network in Japan. It was founded in 1981.

TOKYO FM is the main station of the network.

Japan FM Network stations

Special station

Originally in JFN, but now independent 

FM Fuji was a member from 1988 to 1992.

Stations that are planning to have frequencies removed 
Nara - 85.8 MHz
Wakayama - 77.2 MHz

FMQ League 
 is a sub-network of JFN for the region of Kyūshū (excluding Okinawa Prefecture).

Members 
 fm fukuoka
 FM Saga (FMS)
 fm nagasaki
 FM Kumamoto
 FM Oita (Air Radio FM88)
 FM Miyazaki (Joy FM)
 FM Kagoshima (mu FM/μFM)
 FM Yamaguchi (FMY) (from Chūgoku region)

References

External links
 JFN Homepage
 JFN Portal

Radio in Japan
1981 in Japan
Radio stations established in 1981
Japanese radio networks